Dyserth Waterfall is a waterfall in Dyserth, North Wales.
The River Ffyddion, a tributary of the River Clwyd, falls down a 70-foot ledge creating the waterfall. In the 1880s, mining in the area caused it to dry up, however when the mining stopped, the waterfall resumed its full flow.

References

Waterfalls of Denbighshire